Rejuvenile: Kickball, Cartoons, Cupcakes, and the Reinvention of the American Grown-up is a non-fiction book written by author Christopher Noxon and published by Crown Publishing in 2006. The term "rejuvenile" refers to people who "cultivate tastes and mindsets traditionally associated with those younger than themselves."

Summary 
Noxon explores adults who behave and think in childlike and childish ways, and concludes that their behavior is not necessarily a bad thing. According to the book, many rejuveniles have found ways to lead productive and responsible lives without tossing aside things they've always loved—from Necco Wafers to The Adventures of Tintin to skateboarding. The book has numerous stories about like-minded adults who pursue activities such as playing dodgeball on the weekends, going to Walt Disney World Resort (without kids), and collecting toys.

Appearance on The Colbert Report 
Christopher Noxon appeared on The Colbert Report on June 29, 2006. On the show, Noxon told the story of how he met his wife. Apparently they met while playing kickball (Colbert: You were both in eighth grade? Noxon: No, mid-twenties). He later proposed to her on the same field. He put the ring inside of a kickball and then reinflated it and gave it to her. He also gave her a knife, so that she could cut it open and get the ring out. Unfortunately, there was a Little League team nearby, and when they saw him with the knife, they started yelling "Don't kill her!" They got married and have three children.

Later, Colbert brought out a box of cupcakes, but Noxon turned them down, joking, "I'm gonna have it after, 'cause I don't wanna muss up my visage."

Colbert also brought up the idea that Noxon was very reluctant to qualify the rejuvenile movement as specifically a good thing or a bad thing. Noxon clarified: being childlike can be good, but being childish isn't. "There's a big difference between childish and childlike. And childish is sort of impatient and silly and ridiculous and temper tantrums and brat behavior, and childlike is open and creative and flexible."

Other media 
 Noxon has conducted radio interviews with Talk of the Nation, WHYY-FM, KMOX, and Money Matters Financial Network.
 In print, Rejuvenile has been featured in coverage of USA Today, The Globe and Mail, CBS News and Detroit Free Press.*  has links to all t
 Noxon posts a blog on amazon.com.
 In the episode "A Pool and His Money" of Weeds, Uncle Andy remarks to an angry mob that he is "rejuvenile", and that the chocolate milk he is buying is for him not a young boy. The book is shown in several episodes.
 In Episode 11 of Season 2 of Orange Is the New Black, Healy is shown reading the book; he puts it aside when an inmate comes in to meet with him.

References

External links
 Rejuvenile.com features excerpts, reviews and interviews.

Popular culture books
2006 non-fiction books